was a  after Ōhō and before Eiman. This period spanned the years from March 1163 through June 1165.

Change of era
 February 5, 1163 : The new era name was created to mark an event or series of events.  The previous era ended and a new one commenced in Ōhō 3, on the 29th day of the 3rd month.

Events of the Chōkan era
 1163 (Chōkan 1, 1st month): Taira no Shigemori (1138–1179) was promoted to the second rank of the 3rd class in the court hierarchy.
 1163 (Chōkan 2, 2nd month): A large congregation of Buddhist priests came together at the Tōdai-ji and Kōfuku-ji temples to recite prayers for the prosperity of the Imperial Family.
 September 14, 1164 (Chōkan 2, on the 26th day of the 8th month): The former-Emperor Sutoku died at the age of 46.

See also

Notes

References
 Brown, Delmer M. and Ichirō Ishida, eds. (1979).  Gukanshō: The Future and the Past. Berkeley: University of California Press. ;  OCLC 251325323
 Nussbaum, Louis-Frédéric and Käthe Roth. (2005).  Japan encyclopedia. Cambridge: Harvard University Press. ;  OCLC 58053128
 Titsingh, Isaac. (1834). Nihon Odai Ichiran; ou,  Annales des empereurs du Japon.  Paris: Royal Asiatic Society, Oriental Translation Fund of Great Britain and Ireland. OCLC 5850691
 Varley, H. Paul. (1980). A Chronicle of Gods and Sovereigns: Jinnō Shōtōki of Kitabatake Chikafusa. New York: Columbia University Press.  ;  OCLC 6042764

External links 
 National Diet Library, "The Japanese Calendar" -- historical overview plus illustrative images from library's collection

Japanese eras
1160s in Japan